Vernon Cecil Frederick Bell (10 October 1922 – 27 February 2004) is often credited as "the father of British karate".

Bell was taught karate by Henry Plée and brought karate to Great Britain.

References

1922 births
2004 deaths
People from Ilford
English male judoka
English jujutsuka
English male karateka